The New York Drama Critics' Circle is made up of 22 drama critics from daily newspapers, magazines and wire services based in the New York City metropolitan area. The organization is best known for its annual awards for excellence in theater.

The organization was founded in 1935 at the Algonquin Hotel by a group that included Brooks Atkinson, Walter Winchell, and Robert Benchley. Adam Feldman of Time Out New York has been President of the organization since 2005; Joe Dziemianowicz is currently Vice President, and Zachary Stewart of TheaterMania serves as Treasurer.

Member affiliations

amNewYork
The Hollywood Reporter
New York

New York Daily News
New York Post
The New Yorker

The Star-Ledger
TheaterMania
Time Out New York

The Undefeated 
Variety 
Wall Street Journal

The New York Times membership history
Although Brooks Atkinson of The New York Times was the first President of the NYDCC, Times critics are no longer permitted to be members of the group. In 1989, the newspaper's executive editor decreed that their critics could no longer participate in any awards voting. Times critics remained in the organization as non-voting members until 1997, when the newspaper reversed its policy and allowed its critics to resume voting for the awards. However, in 2003, the newspaper adopted a revised ethics policy that forbade its journalists from membership in an awards-voting body, and its critics withdrew from the NYDCC. , the Timess policy against membership remains in effect.

New York Drama Critics' Circle Award
The New York Drama Critics' Circle meets twice a year. At the end of each theater season, it votes on the annual New York Drama Critics' Circle Awards, the second oldest theater award in the United States (after the Pulitzer Prize). The main award is for Best Play. If the winner of that award is American, the Circle then votes on whether to give an award for Best Foreign Play as well; if the Best Play winner is of foreign origin, the Circle may give out an award for Best American Play. The awards are later presented in a small ceremony. Since 1945, the Circle has also given out awards for Best Musical. Special Citations may also be awarded for actors, companies, or work of special merit. The award for Best Play includes a cash prize of $2,500, and a cash award of $1,000 is given to the playwright who receives the award for Best American or Foreign Play.

Theatre awards and citation winners

Best Play

1936: Winterset – Maxwell Anderson
1937: High Tor – Maxwell Anderson
1938: Of Mice and Men – John Steinbeck
1940: The Time of Your Life – William Saroyan
1941: Watch on the Rhine – Lillian Hellman
1943: The Patriots – Sidney Kingsley
1945: The Glass Menagerie – Tennessee Williams
1947: All My Sons – Arthur Miller
1948: A Streetcar Named Desire – Tennessee Williams
1949: Death of a Salesman – Arthur Miller
1950: The Member of the Wedding – Carson McCullers
1951: Darkness at Noon – Sidney Kingsley
1952: I Am a Camera – John Van Druten
1953: Picnic – William Inge
1954: The Teahouse of the August Moon – John Patrick
1955: Cat on a Hot Tin Roof – Tennessee Williams
1956: The Diary of Anne Frank – Frances Goodrich and Albert Hackett
1957: Long Day's Journey into Night – Eugene O'Neill
1958: Look Homeward, Angel – Ketti Frings
1959: A Raisin in the Sun – Lorraine Hansberry
1960: Toys in the Attic – Lillian Hellman
1961: All the Way Home – Tad Mosel
1962: The Night of the Iguana – Tennessee Williams
1963: Who's Afraid of Virginia Woolf? – Edward Albee
1964: Luther – John Osborne
1965: The Subject Was Roses – Frank D. Gilroy
1966: Marat/Sade by Peter Weiss
1967: The Homecoming – Harold Pinter
1968: Rosencrantz and Guildenstern Are Dead – Tom Stoppard
1969: The Great White Hope – Howard Sackler
1970: Borstal Boy – Frank McMahon
1971: Home – David Storey
1972: That Championship Season – Jason Miller
1973: The Changing Room – David Storey
1974: The Contractors – David Storey
1975: Equus – Peter Shaffer
1976: Travesties – Tom Stoppard
1977: Otherwise Engaged – Simon Gray
1978: Da – Hugh Leonard
1979: The Elephant Man – Bernard Pomerance
1980: Talley's Folly – Lanford Wilson

1981: A Lesson from Aloes – Athol Fugard
1982: The Life and Adventures of Nicholas Nickleby (play) – David Edgar
1983: Brighton Beach Memoirs – Neil Simon
1984: The Real Thing – Tom Stoppard
1985: Ma Rainey's Black Bottom – August Wilson
1986: A Lie of the Mind – Sam Shepard
1987: Fences – August Wilson
1988: Joe Turner's Come and Gone – August Wilson
1989: The Heidi Chronicles – Wendy Wasserstein
1990: The Piano Lesson – August Wilson
1991: Six Degrees of Separation – John Guare
1992: Dancing at Lughnasa – Brian Friel
1993: Angels in America: Millennium Approaches – Tony Kushner
1994: Three Tall Women – Edward Albee
1995: Arcadia – Tom Stoppard
1996: Seven Guitars – August Wilson
1997: How I Learned to Drive – Paula Vogel
1998: Art – Yasmina Reza
1999: Wit – Margaret Edson
2000: Jitney – August Wilson
2001: The Invention of Love – Tom Stoppard
2002: The Goat, or Who Is Sylvia? – Edward Albee
2003: Take Me Out – Richard Greenberg
2004: Intimate Apparel – Lynn Nottage
2005: Doubt – John Patrick Shanley
2006: The History Boys – Alan Bennett
2007: The Coast of Utopia – Tom Stoppard
2008: August: Osage County – Tracy Letts
2009: Ruined – Lynn Nottage 
2010: The Orphans' Home Cycle – Horton Foote
2011: Good People – David Lindsay-Abaire
2012: Sons of the Prophet – Stephen Karam
2013: Vanya and Sonia and Masha and Spike – Christopher Durang  
2014: The Night Alive – Conor McPherson
2015: Between Riverside and Crazy – Stephen Adly Guirgis
2016: The Humans – Stephen Karam
2017: Oslo – J.T. Rogers
2018: Mary Jane – Amy Herzog
2019: The Ferryman – Jez Butterworth
2020: Heroes of the Fourth Turning – Will Arbery
2021: A Case for the Existence of God – Samuel D. Hunter

Best Foreign Play  

1938: Shadow and Substance – Paul Vincent Carroll
1939: The White Steed – Paul Vincent Carroll
1941: The Corn Is Green – Emlyn Williams
1942: Blithe Spirit – Noël Coward
1944: Jacobowsky and the Colonel (Jacobowsky und der Oberst) – Franz Werfel
1947: No Exit – Jean-Paul Sartre
1948: The Winslow Boy – Terence Rattigan
1949: The Madwoman of Chaillot – Jean Giraudoux
1950: The Cocktail Party – T. S. Eliot
1951: The Lady's Not for Burning – Christopher Fry
1952: Venus Observed – Christopher Fry
1953: The Love of Four Colonels – Peter Ustinov
1954: Ondine – Jean Giraudoux
1955: Witness for the Prosecution – Agatha Christie
1956: Tiger at the Gates – Jean Giraudoux and Christopher Fry
1957: The Waltz of the Toreadors – Jean Anouilh
1958: Look Back in Anger – John Osborne
1959: The Visit – Friedrich Dürrenmatt and Maurice Valency
1960: Five Finger Exercise – Peter Shaffer
1961: A Taste of Honey – Shelagh Delaney
1962: A Man for All Seasons – Robert Bolt
1972: The Screens – Jean Genet
1980: Betrayal – Harold Pinter
1983: Plenty – David Hare
1986: Benefactors – Michael Frayn
1987: Les Liaisons Dangereuses – Christopher Hampton
1988: The Road to Mecca – Athol Fugard
1989: Aristocrats – Brian Friel
1990: Privates on Parade – Peter Nichols
1991: Our Country's Good – Timberlake Wertenbaker
1993: Someone Who'll Watch Over Me – Frank McGuinness
1996: Molly Sweeney – Brian Friel
1997: Skylight – David Hare
1999: Closer – Patrick Marber
2000: Copenhagen – Michael Frayn
2003: Talking Heads – Alan Bennett
2005: The Pillowman – Martin McDonagh
2009: Black Watch – Gregory Burke
2011: Jerusalem – Jez Butterworth
2012: Tribes – Nina Raine 
2018: Hangmen – Martin McDonagh

Best American Play  
1970: The Effect of Gamma Rays on Man-in-the-Moon Marigolds – Paul Zindel
1971: The House of Blue Leaves – John Guare
1973: The Hot l Baltimore – Lanford Wilson
1974: Short Eyes – Miguel Piñero
1975: The Taking of Miss Janie – Ed Bullins
1976: Streamers – David Rabe
1977: American Buffalo – David Mamet
1981: Crimes of the Heart – Beth Henley
1982: A Soldier's Play – Charles Fuller
1984: Glengarry Glen Ross – David Mamet
1992: Two Trains Running – August Wilson
1995: Love! Valour! Compassion! – Terrence McNally
1998: Pride's Crossing – Tina Howe
2001: Proof – David Auburn
2007: Radio Golf – August Wilson
2014: All the Way – Robert Schenkkan
2019: What the Constitution Means to Me – Heidi Schreck

Best Musical  

1946: Carousel – Richard Rodgers and Oscar Hammerstein II
1947: Brigadoon – Frederick Loewe and Alan Jay Lerner
1949: South Pacific – Richard Rodgers, Oscar Hammerstein II, and Joshua Logan
1950: The Consul – Gian Carlo Menotti
1951: Guys and Dolls – Frank Loesser, Abe Burrows and Jo Swerling,
1952: Pal Joey – Richard Rodgers, Lorenz Hart, and John O'Hara
1953: Wonderful Town – Joseph Fields, Jerome Chodorov, Betty Comden, Adolph Green, and Leonard Bernstein
1954: The Golden Apple (musical) – John La Touche and Jerome Moross
1955: The Saint of Bleecker Street – Gian Carlo Menotti
1956: My Fair Lady – Frederick Loewe and Alan Jay Lerner
1957: The Most Happy Fella – Frank Loesser
1958: The Music Man – Meredith Willson
1959: La Plume de Ma Tante – Robert Dhéry, Ross Parker, Francis Blanche, and Gérard Calvi
1960: Fiorello! – Jerry Bock, Sheldon Harnick, George Abbott and Jerome Weidman
1961: Carnival! – Michael Stewart and Bob Merrill
1962: How to Succeed in Business Without Really Trying – Abe Burrows, Jack Weinstock, Willie Gilbert, and Frank Loesser
1964: Hello, Dolly! – Michael Stewart and Jerry Herman
1965: Fiddler on the Roof – Jerry Bock, Sheldon Harnick and Joseph Stein
1966: Man of La Mancha – Dale Wasserman, Mitch Leigh, and Joe Darion
1967: Cabaret – John Kander, Fred Ebb, and Joe Masteroff
1968: Your Own Thing – Donald Driver, Hal Hester, and Danny Apolinar
1969: 1776 – Sherman Edwards and Peter Stone
1970: Company – Stephen Sondheim and George Furth
1971: Follies – Stephen Sondheim and William Goldman
1972: Two Gentlemen of Verona – Galt MacDermot, John Guare and Mel Shapiro
1973: A Little Night Music – Stephen Sondheim and Hugh Wheeler
1974: Candide – Leonard Bernstein, Richard Wilbur, Hugh Wheeler and John La Touche
1975: A Chorus Line – Marvin Hamlisch, Edward Kleban, James Kirkwood and Nicholas Dante
1976: Pacific Overtures – Stephen Sondheim, John Weidman and Hugh Wheeler
1977: Annie – Charles Strouse, Martin Charnin and Thomas Meehan
1978: Ain't Misbehavin' – Fats Waller and Richard Maltby Jr.

1979: Sweeney Todd – Stephen Sondheim and Hugh Wheeler
1980: Evita – Andrew Lloyd Webber and Tim Rice
1983: Little Shop of Horrors – Alan Menken and Howard Ashman
1984: Sunday in the Park with George – Stephen Sondheim and James Lapine
1987: Les Misérables – Claude-Michel Schönberg, Alain Boublil and Herbert Kretzmer
1988: Into the Woods – Stephen Sondheim and James Lapine
1990: City of Angels – Larry Gelbart, Cy Coleman, and David Zippel
1991: The Will Rogers Follies – Cy Coleman, Betty Comden, Adolph Green and Peter Stone
1993: Kiss of the Spider Woman – John Kander, Fred Ebb, and Terrence McNally
1996: Rent – Jonathan Larson
1997: Violet – Jeanine Tesori and Brian Crawley
1998: The Lion King – Elton John, Tim Rice, Roger Allers and Irene Mecchi
1999: Parade – Jason Robert Brown and Alfred Uhry
2000: James Joyce's The Dead – Shaun Davey and Richard Nelson
2001: The Producers – Mel Brooks and Thomas Meehan
2003: Hairspray – Marc Shaiman, Scott Wittman, Thomas Meehan and Mark O'Donnell
2006: The Drowsy Chaperone – Bob Martin, Don McKellar, Lisa Lambert and Greg Morrison
2007: Spring Awakening – Duncan Sheik and Steven Sater
2008: Passing Strange – Stew and Heidi Rodewald
2009: Billy Elliot the Musical – Elton John and Lee Hall
2010: No award
2011: The Book of Mormon – Trey Parker, Matt Stone and Robert Lopez
2012: Once – Enda Walsh, Glen Hansard and Markéta Irglová 
2013: Matilda the Musical – Tim Minchin and Dennis Kelly
2014: Fun Home – Jeanine Tesori and Lisa Kron
2015: Hamilton – Lin-Manuel Miranda
2016: Shuffle Along, or, the Making of the Musical Sensation of 1921 and All That Followed – George C. Wolfe, Eubie Blake and Noble Sissle
2017: The Band's Visit – Itamar Moses and David Yazbek
2018: No award
2019: Tootsie – David Yazbek and Robert Horn
2020: A Strange Loop – Michael R. Jackson
2021: Kimberly Akimbo – David Lindsay-Abaire and Jeanine Tesori

Special awards and citations
1952: Don Juan in Hell – George Bernard Shaw
1963: Beyond the Fringe – Alan Bennett, Peter Cook, Jonathan Miller and Dudley Moore
1964: The Trojan Women – Euripides
1966: Mark Twain Tonight – Hal Holbrook
1971: Sticks and Bones by David Rabe and Old Times by Harold Pinter
1980: Peter Brook's Le Centre International de Créations Théâtricales at La Mama
1981: Lena Horne for Lena Horne: The Lady and Her Music and New York Shakespeare Festival's The Pirates of Penzance
1983: Young Playwrights Festival
1984: Samuel Beckett for the body of his work
1986: The Search for Signs of Intelligent Life in the Universe – Lily Tomlin and Jane Wagner
1989: Largely New York – Bill Irwin
1992: Eileen Atkins – A Room of One's Own
1994: Anna Deavere Smith – Twilight: Los Angeles, 1992
1994: Signature Theatre Company's Horton Foote season
1997: Chicago revival — Encores!
1998: Cabaret – Roundabout Theatre Company
1999: David Hare
2002: Elaine Stritch – Elaine Stritch at Liberty
2004: Barbara Cook
2006: John Doyle, Sarah Travis  – Sweeney Todd and Christine Ebersole – Grey Gardens
2007: Journey's End – Broadway revival
2009: Angela Lansbury; Matthew Warchus and the cast of The Norman Conquests; Gerard Alessandrini for Forbidden Broadway
2010: Lincoln Center Festival; Viola Davis; Annie Baker
2011: The Normal Heart; Mark Rylance for La Bête and Jerusalem; and the direction, design and puppetry of War Horse
2012: Signature Theatre Company; Mike Nichols
2013: Soho Rep; New York City Center's Encores!; John Lee Beatty
2014: The Shakespeare's Globe productions of Twelfth Night and Richard III; Richard Nelson and the company of the Apple Family Plays
2015: Ars Nova and Bob Crowley
2016: Oskar Eustis; Lois Smith; Ivo van Hove and Jan Versweyveld
2017: Taylor Mac for A 24-Decade History of Popular Music, Ruben Santiago-Hudson and the cast of Jitney, and Paula Vogel for career achievement as a playwright and mentor
2018: Park Avenue Armory for adventurous theatrical programming; Transport Group; the staging, design and illusions of Harry Potter and the Cursed Child
2019: Irish Repertory Theatre; Page 73; National Yiddish Theatre Folksbiene's revival of Fiddler on the Roof (Fidler Afn Dakh)
2020: David Byrne and the Broadway production of American Utopia; Deirdre O'Connell; the New York theater community for perseverance in the face of loss during the COVID-19 pandemic
2021: Actor Austin Pendleton for lifetime achievement; playwright Sanaz Toossi

Runners-up

See also
Tony Awards
Drama Desk Awards
Obie Awards
Laurence Olivier Awards
London Critics' Circle Theatre Awards

References

Past Awards, New York Drama Critics' Circle

Notes

External links
New York Drama Critics' Circle official site

American theater awards
 
Awards established in 1935
1935 establishments in New York City